Rip tide is a strong tidal flow of water within estuaries and other enclosed tidal areas.

Riptide or rip tide may also refer to:

 A common misnomer for a rip current, a fast narrow current running offshore and cutting through breaking waves

Amusement rides
 Riptide (Canada's Wonderland), a Top Spin ride
 Riptide, a pirate ship ride at Morey's Piers
 Rip Tide, a Top Spin ride at Knott's Berry Farm

Books
 Riptide (book series), short story anthologies
 Riptide (novel), by Douglas Preston and Lincoln Child, 1998
Riptide, a novel by Catherine Coulter, 2000
Riptide, a novel by Cherry Adair, 2011
Riptide, a Star Wars novel by Paul S. Kemp, 2011
Rip Tide, a novel in verse by William Rose Benét, 1932
Rip Tide, a novel by Sam Llewellyn, 1992
 Rip Tide (novella), a Doctor Who novella by Louise Cooper, 2003
Rip Tide, a novel by Kat Falls, 2011  
Rip Tide, a novel by Stella Rimington, 2011

Comics
 Riptide (Marvel Comics), a character in the Marvel universe
 Riptide (Youngblood), a character in the Image and Awesome Comics universes

Films and television
 Rip Tide (film), 2017 Australian film
 Riptide (1934 film), by Edmund Goulding
 Riptide (2013 film) (aka Ressac), a Canadian drama film by Pascale Ferland
 Riptide (American TV series), 1984–1986 American detective series
 Riptide (Australian TV series), 1969 Australian drama series starring Ty Hardin
 Riptide (2022 TV series), 2022 Australian drama miniseries

Music
 The Riptides, Australian power pop group formed in 1977
 The Riptides (Canadian band), Canadian punk rock band formed in 1998
 Riptide (album), 1985 album by Robert Palmer, or its title track
 The Rip Tide, 2011 album by Beirut
 "Riptide" (Sick Puppies song), 2011
 "Riptide" (Vance Joy song), 2013
 "Riptide" (The Chainsmokers song), 2022
 "Riptide", a 2022 single by Beartooth
 Rip Tide, background music in SpongeBob SquarePants

Sport
Central Jersey Riptide, a defunct soccer team from Clark, New Jersey
Los Angeles Riptide, a defunct outdoor lacrosse team from Carson, California
New England Riptide, a defunct women's softball team from Lowell, Massachusetts
New York Riptide, a box lacrosse team from Uniondale, New York
Oregon Riptide, a defunct basketball team in Portland, Oregon
San Diego Riptide, a defunct football team in San Diego, California
Riptide, ringname of American professional wrestler Angel Orsini
Riptide, a finisher move of the professional wrestler Rhea Ripley

Other
Dead Island: Riptide, a 2013 video game
Riptide ("Anaklusmos"), Percy Jackson's sword in the Percy Jackson & the Olympians book series
Riptide Publishing, a publisher of LGBTQ fiction; see